Snåsa is a municipality in Trøndelag county, Norway. It is part of the Innherred region. The administrative centre of the municipality is the village of Snåsa. Other villages include Agle and Jørstad.

Snåsa is one of the last strongholds for the seriously endangered Southern Sami language.

The  municipality is the 23rd largest by area out of the 356 municipalities in Norway. Snåsa is the 277th most populous municipality in Norway with a population of 2,033 inhabitants.

General information
The parish of Snåsa was established as a municipality on 1 January 1838. On 1 January 1874, the eastern district of Snåsa (population: 1,015) was separated to form a new, separate municipality of Lierne. This left Snåsa with 2,235 residents. Snåsa's boundaries have not changed since then.  

On 1 January 2018, the municipality switched from the old Nord-Trøndelag county to the new Trøndelag county.

Name
The municipality (originally the parish) is named Snåsa, but it was spelled Snaasen until the early 20th century. The name comes from the Old Norse word  which means "prominent mountain" or "overhanging rock" (possibly referring to the mountain of Bergsåsen, at the inner end of the lake Snåsavatnet).

Coat of arms
The coat of arms was granted on 17 March 1994. The official blazon is "Azure, a lady's-slipper orchid Or.". This means the arms have a blue field (background) and the charge is a lady's-slipper orchid (Cypripedium calceolus). The lady's-slipper orchid has a tincture of Or which means it is commonly colored yellow, but if it is made out of metal, then gold is used. The design was chosen to symbolize the prevalence of orchids growing in the municipality. This particular flower is one of at least 15 species of orchids that grow in Snåsa. The arms were designed by Even Jarl Skoglund. The municipal flag has the same design as the coat of arms.

Churches
The Church of Norway has one parish within the municipality of Snåsa. It is part of the Nord-Innherad prosti (deanery) in the Diocese of Nidaros.

Geography

Snåsa borders the municipalities of Overhalla, Grong, and Lierne in the north and east, and Steinkjer and Verdal in the west and south. The 6th largest lake in the country, Snåsavatnet, is partly located in the municipality. Other lakes include Andorsjøen, Bangsjøene, Grøningen, Holderen, and Store Øyingen. The Blåfjella–Skjækerfjella National Park covers a lot of the eastern part of the municipality.

Government
All municipalities in Norway, including Snåsa, are responsible for primary education (through 10th grade), outpatient health services, senior citizen services, unemployment and other social services, zoning, economic development, and municipal roads. The municipality is governed by a municipal council of elected representatives, which in turn elect a mayor.  The municipality falls under the Trøndelag District Court and the Frostating Court of Appeal.

Municipal council
The municipal council of Snåsa is made up of 21 representatives that are elected to four year terms. The party breakdown of the council is as follows:

Mayors
The mayors of Snåsa:

1837–1839: Jens Rynning
1840–1843: Pål Olsen Gran
1844–1847: Jens Rynning
1848–1851: Bård Larsen Bøgset
1852–1859: Lorentz Peter Elster
1860–1861: Peter Muus
1862–1865: Bertel Gravbrøt
1866–1868: Lorentz Nicolai Bøgset
1868–1871: Thomas Conrad Hirsch
1872–1873: Peter Muus
1874–1875: Butulf Brønstad
1876–1883: Erik Belbo (V)
1884–1887: Gunnerius Larsen (V)
1888–1893: Nils Muus (V)
1894–1898: Ole Eggen (V)
1899–1901: Nils Muus (V)
1902–1907: Ole Eggen (V)
1908–1916: Lorents Seem (Rp)
1917–1919: Johan N. Brede (LL)
1920–1922: Størker Jørstad (V)
1922-1922: Arne H. Five (LL)
1923–1925: Nikolai Kjenstad (Bp)
1926–1928: Arne H. Five (V)
1929–1934: Olaf Eggen (Bp)
1935–1937: Emil Mona (Bp)
1938–1945: Olaf Eggen (Bp/NS))
1945-1945: Emil Mona (Bp)
1945-1945: Peter Finsaas (V)
1946–1947: Jon Viem (Ap)
1948-1948: Peter Finsaas (V)
1948–1951: Johannes Gåsmo (Bp)
1952–1955: Jon Viem (Ap)
1956–1963: Johannes Gåsmo (Sp)
1964–1967: Åsmund Grande (Sp)
1968–1975: Arne Sandnes (Sp)
1976–1987: Fridtjof Jørstad (Sp)
1988–1989: Ludvig Lundheim (V)
1990–1991: Arnold Skjemstad (Ap)
1992–1999: Eystein Bardal (Sp)
1999–2003: Alfred Berget (Ap)
2003-2015: Vigdis Hjulstad Belbo (Sp)
2015-2019: Tone Våg (Ap)
2019–present: Arnt Einar Bardal (Sp)

Transportation
The European route E6 highway runs through the municipality on the north side of the Snåsavatnet lake and the Nordland Line runs along the south side of the lake. The train stops at Jørstad Station and Snåsa Station.

Trivia
 Inge Altemberg, the leading character in the movie Sweet Land, played by Elizabeth Reaser comes to America just after WWI from Snåsa

Notable people 

 Jens Rynning (1778–1857) a Norwegian priest and public education advocate, spent his working life as a priest in Ringsaker and Snåsa
 Bernt Julius Muus (1832 in Snåsa – 1900) a Norwegian-American Lutheran minister, helped found St. Olaf College in Northfield, Minnesota
 Peder Falstad (1894 in Snåsa – 1965) an American ski jumper, competed at the 1932 Winter Olympics
 Arne Sandnes (1924 in Snåsa – 2016) a politician and Mayor of Snåsa municipal council
 Joralf Gjerstad (born 1926 in Snåsa) a self identified psychic and untested faith healer, known as "the man with warm hands"
 Geir Høgsnes (1950 in Snåsa - 2009) a Norwegian sociologist and academic
 Jon Åge Tyldum (born 1968 in Snåsa) a former Norwegian biathlete
 Anders Eide (born 1971 in Snåsa) a Norwegian cross-country skier who competed at the 1998 Winter Olympics

Media gallery

References

External links

Municipal fact sheet from Statistics Norway 

 
Municipalities of Trøndelag
Sámi-language municipalities
1838 establishments in Norway